Saatlen is a quarter in the district 12 of Zürich, located in the Glatt Valley (German: Glattal).

It was formerly a part of Schwamendingen municipality, which was incorporated into Zürich in 1934.

The quarter has a population of 6,727 distributed on an area of 1.13 km².

District 12 of Zürich